Jason Elliott is a member of the South Carolina House of Representatives where he has represented the 22nd District since 2016. He is a member of the Republican Party.

Elliott was elected to the S.C. House of Representatives in 2016 and serves on the Education and Public Works Committee, where he is chairman of the Motor Vehicle Subcommittee. Elliott is the first openly gay person to be elected to the South Carolina General Assembly.

Electoral history

2016

2018

2020

References

Meet Jason – Jason Elliott

External links 
 Member Profile - South Carolina State Legislature

Republican Party members of the South Carolina House of Representatives
Living people
21st-century American politicians
United States congressional aides
LGBT state legislators in South Carolina
Gay politicians
1970 births